Rotenburger Sportverein e.V. is a football club based in Rotenburg an der Wümme, Lower Saxony, Germany, founded in 1919.

Stadium
The club plays its home matches at the Sportanlage In der Ahe, which has a capacity of 3,000. The stadium has hosted youth international matches.

Recent seasons
The recent season-by-season performance of the club

 With the introduction of the Regionalligas in 1994 and the 3. Liga in 2008 as the new third tier, below the 2. Bundesliga, all leagues below dropped one tier.

References 

1919 establishments in Germany
Football clubs in Germany
Association football clubs established in 1919
Football clubs in Lower Saxony